Robert Rice Reynolds (June 18, 1884 – February 13, 1963) was an American politician who served as a Democratic US senator from North Carolina from 1932 to 1945. Almost from the outset of his Senate career, "Our Bob," as he was known among his local supporters, acquired distinction as a passionate isolationist and increasingly notoriety as an apologist for Nazi aggression in Europe. Even after America's entry into World War II, according to a contemporary study of subversive elements in America, he "publicly endorsed the propaganda efforts of Gerald L. K. Smith," whose scurrilous publication The Cross and the Flag "violently assailed the United States war effort and America's allies." One of the nation's most influential fascists, Smith likewise collaborated with Reynolds on The Defender, an antisemitic newspaper that was partly owned by Reynolds.

Reynolds occasionally turned over his Senate office facilities to subversive propagandists and allowed them to use his franking to mail their literature postage-free. He was also a supporter of the New Deal.

Early life
He was born on June 18, 1884, in Asheville, North Carolina, at his family's estate, the Reynolds House. He was the son of William Taswell Reynolds (1850–1892) and Mamie Elizabeth Spears (1862–1939). He was descended from a family of Revolutionary War heroes and pioneers, politicians, and property owners, including his maternal great-grandfather, Colonel Daniel Smith, a Revolutionary War hero of the Battle of Kings Mountain. His siblings included George Spears Reynolds (1881–1924) and Jane Reynolds Wood (1888–1927).

Reynolds attended public and private schools, including Weaver College, a preparatory school, before entering the University of North Carolina. While at UNC, he played football, ran track, and was the editor of the sports section of The Daily Tar Heel. He left UNC without a degree but was still accepted at the University of North Carolina School of Law. He did not officially enroll but attended lectures and was eventually admitted to the Bar in North Carolina in 1908.

Early career
After passing the bar exam, Reynolds began practicing in Asheville with his brother. He was elected prosecuting attorney, serving from 1910 to 1914, and during World War I, registered for military service. He was never drafted but briefly served in the National Guard. In 1924, he ran for Lieutenant Governor of North Carolina, losing to J. Elmer Long in the Democratic primary.

In 1926, Reynolds first ran for the US Senate, but was unsuccessful and lost the primary to Lee Overman.  He ran again in 1932 and defeated former Governor and interim Senator Cameron Morrison in the Democratic primary runoff by nearly two-to-one after running a particularly nasty, populist campaign in which he accused Morrison of being a Communist sympathizer. During one campaign speech, he proclaimed, "Cam likes fish eggs, and Red Russian fish eggs at that. Don't you want a Senator who likes North Carolina hen eggs?"

US Senate
In his first term, Reynolds was in favor of Franklin Roosevelt's New Deal and believed that it provided much-needed jobs for his North Carolinans. That allowed the Blue Ridge Parkway and the Great Smoky Mountains National Park to be built.  Reynolds favored taxing the wealthy and imposing regulations on the economy. In addition, he supported Social Security, the Fair Labor Standards Act, the Works Progress Administration, Tennessee Valley Authority, and the Agricultural Adjustment Act, which raised tobacco prices. Reynolds initially supported Roosevelt's Judicial Procedures Reform Bill of 1937 to pack the Supreme Court but later joined other Democrats in sending it back to the Judiciary Committee, effectively killing the bill.

Reynolds was an advocate of "Fortress America" and supported a strong national defense, including an expansion of the United States Armed Forces. However, he was also a leading isolationist. He vociferously opposed Roosevelt's efforts to revise the Neutrality Acts. Reynolds and Senator John Overton of Louisiana were the only senators from the South to vote against the repeal of the arms embargo. Therefore, during his 1938 re-election campaign, Roosevelt recruited Franklin W. Hancock, Jr. to oppose Reynolds in the Democratic primary, but Reynolds won handily.

An advocate of immigration restriction, Reynolds spoke out against the Wagner–Rogers Bill that aimed to accept 20,000 Jewish refugee children into the United States from Nazi Germany. He elicited the praise of the magazine "Social Justice," organized by demagogue and radio priest Charles Coughlin.

In 1941, Reynolds, described by the leftist newspaper PM as "the Senate's No. 1 alien-baiter," called for a 10-year ban on all immigration to the United States and said that "the time has come for changing the tradition that the U.S.A. is an asylum for the oppressed." He also demanded that newly-arrived immigrants, "millions of foreigners who are about to begin the rape of this country," should be deported or detained in concentration camps.

Unusually for a major American politician, Reynolds openly praised Nazi Germany and worked with fascist intellectuals such as Gerald L. K. Smith and George Sylvester Viereck. In 1941, Reynolds became chairman of the Senate Committee on Military Affairs. After the Pearl Harbor attack and the German declaration of war against the United States in December 1941, he partially reversed his pro-German and pro-fascist opinions and introduced a bill to extend the Selective Training and Service Act sponsored by the U.S. War Department.  Nevertheless, a confidential 1943 analysis of the Senate Foreign Relations Committee by Isaiah Berlin for the British Foreign Office stated that Reynolds

By 1944, the Democratic Party had had enough of Reynolds and chose former Governor Clyde R. Hoey to seek Reynolds's seat in the primary. As a result, Reynolds did not seek reelection. Hoey won the primary and went on to win the general election in a landslide victory over a Republican opponent. Reynolds sought to return to the Senate in 1950, but he was by then hopelessly discredited and won only 10% in the Democratic primary, behind Frank Porter Graham and Willis Smith.

Later life
After leaving public life, Reynolds practiced law and real estate until his death, in Asheville. He wrote the book Gypsy Trails, Around the World in an Automobile; Asheville, NC: Advocate Publishing Company (presumed date 1923).

Personal life
Reynolds married five times throughout his life and had four children. His first marriage was in 1910 to Frances Jackson (1889–1913). Before her death from typhoid fever in 1913, they had two children together:
 Frances Jackson Reynolds (1910–1955)
 Robert Rice Reynolds, Jr. (1913–1950)
In 1914, he married 17-year-old Mary Bland (b. 1897). Less than a year after their marriage, he left his new wife and their child. Before their divorce in 1917 and her three subsequent marriages, they had one daughter together:
 Mary Bland Reynolds, who died of Hodgkin's disease.

In 1921, he married, for the third time,  Denise D'Arcy, a French woman he met in New York. Reynolds met D'Arcy while he was traveling around the country in his truck and accidentally struck her as she crossed the street. Within five days, he had announced that they had fallen in love and were going to get married. The marriage dissolved after one year, and D'Arcy obtained a legal separation from Reynolds in 1922 and moved back to France. The divorce was ultimately finalized in 1929.

On February 27, 1931, he married for the fourth time to Eva Brady (1898–1934), a former Ziegfeld Follies dancer from Chicago, who came to Asheville looking for a cure for tuberculosis. Eva died on December 13, 1934.

On October 9, 1941, 57-year-old Reynolds married for the fifth and final time to 19-year-old Evalyn Washington McLean (1921–1946), daughter of Edward B. McLean, the former publisher and owner of The Washington Post, and Evalyn Walsh McLean, owner of the Hope Diamond. Together, they had one daughter:
 Mamie Spears Reynolds (1942–2014), an owner and driver for the Reynolds Racing Team of Asheville, the first woman to qualify for the Daytona 500, and co-owner of the ABA Kentucky Colonels professional basketball team. In 1963, she married Luigi "Coco" Chinetti Jr., son of Italian racecar driver and Ferrari agent Luigi Chinetti, and divorced two years later.
On September 20, 1946, his wife, Evalyn, died of an accidental overdose of sleeping pills, which some believe is a result of the Hope Diamond curse.

Death
Reynolds died of cancer on February 13, 1963, at Reynolds House, in Asheville.

References

External links 

 
 
 Rob Christensen: From Buncombe Bob to 'the Tar Heel Fuhrer' 

1884 births
1963 deaths
Politicians from Asheville, North Carolina
North Carolina Democrats
North Carolina lawyers
American prosecutors
1928 United States presidential electors
University of North Carolina at Chapel Hill alumni
Democratic Party United States senators from North Carolina
American anti-war activists
20th-century American politicians
American fascists
History of United States isolationism
American real estate brokers
Deaths from cancer in North Carolina
20th-century American lawyers
Fascist politicians
Antisemitism in the United States
20th-century far-right politicians in the United States